End of the world or The End of the World may refer to: 
 The end time in the eschatology of various religions and mythologies
 End of the world (fiction), fiction that is concerned with the end of human civilization
 Global catastrophe scenarios resulting in the destruction of the planet, human extinction, or the end of human civilization

Art
 The End of the World (painting), an 1853 painting by John Martin
 The End of the World, a lost painting by Francesco Anelli

Books
The End of the World, 1930 novel by Geoffrey Dennis, winner of the 1930 Hawthornden Prize
 Skulduggery Pleasant: The End of the World, a 2012 novella by Derek Landy

Films
 The End of the World (1916 film), a Danish film
 End of the World (1931 film), based on Omega: The Last Days of the World
 Panic in Year Zero!, a 1962 science fiction film also released under the title End of the World
 End of the World (1977 film), a film starring Christopher Lee and Sue Lyon
 The End of the World (1992 film), a Portuguese film
 The End of the World (video), a 2003 viral video
 The working title of This Is the End, a 2013 film
 End of the World, a 2013 film starring Greg Grunberg

Television
 "The End of the World", a 1958 episode of Trackdown
"End of the World", a 1966 episode of The Time Tunnel
 "The End of the World" (Doctor Who), a 2005 episode of Doctor Who
 "End of the World" (Parks and Recreation), a 2011 episode of Parks and Recreation
 Category 7: The End of the World, a 2005 television miniseries
 "The End of the World", an episode of Freddy's Nightmares
 The End of the World (Bernice Summerfield), an audio drama spin-off of Doctor Who
 The End of the World (TV series), a 2013 South Korean TV series directed by Ahn Pan-seok

Music

Bands
 End of the World (band), (also known as Sekai no Owari) a Japanese rock band formed in Tokyo in 2007

Albums
 End of the World (album), by Aphrodite's Child, 1968
 The End of the World (Adam and the Plants album), 2015
 The End of the World (Julie London album), 1963
 The End of the World (Mucc album), 2014
 End of the World, an EP by Alex Metric, 2011

Songs
 "The End of the World" (Skeeter Davis song), a 1962 single by Skeeter Davis
 "End of the World" (Ash song), a 2007 single by alternative rock band Ash
 "The End of the World" (The Cure song), a 2004 song by British alternative rock band The Cure
 "End of the World", a 1978 song from Change of Heart by Eric Carmen
 "End of the World", a 2014 song from Sound of Change by The Dirty Heads
 "The End of the World", a song by Angela from Sora no Koe
 "End of the World", a 2007 song from Smile for Them by Armor for Sleep and the soundtrack for Transformers
 "End of the World", a 2011 bonus track on the German deluxe edition of Panic of Girls by Blondie
 "End of the World", 2007 song by Blackfield from Blackfield II
 "End of the World", a song by the Clubber Lang Band
 "End of the World", a song from 13 Ways to Bleed on Stage by Cold
 "End of the World", a 2009 song from Out of Ashes by Dead by Sunrise
 "The End of the World", a 2004 song from Master of the Moon by Dio
 "The End Of The World", a 2012 song from Christmas Ain't About Me by The Doubleclicks
 "End of the World", a 1997 song from Play by Great Big Sea
 "End of the World", a 2000 song from Duty by Ayumi Hamasaki
 "End of the World", a 2003 song from Modern Artillery by the Living End
 "End of the World", a 2010 song from Above the Noise by McFly
 "End of the World", a 2012 song from Human Again by Ingrid Michaelson
 "End of the World", a 1982 song from Corridors of Power by Gary Moore
 "End of the World", a 2013 song from Picture Show by Neon Trees and Damon Albarn
 "End of the World", a 2008 song from When Angels & Serpents Dance by P.O.D.
 "The End of the World", a 1990 song from Behaviour by the Pet Shop Boys
 "End of the World", a 2005 song from Anxiety by Smile Empty Soul
 "End of the World", a 1995 song by Waltons from their 1995 album Cock's Crow
"End of the World", a 2011 song by Alex Metric and Charli XCX

See also 
 The End of the F***ing World, a graphic novel by Charles Forsman
 The End of the F***ing World (sometimes written as The End of the Fucking World), a UK TV show which first aired in 2017
 The End of the World as We Know It (disambiguation)
 "It's the End of the World", 2006 episode of Grey's Anatomy
 The ultimate fate of the Earth, see Future of Earth
 End of the World Route, a Chilean tourist route at the southernmost part of the Americas
 World's End (disambiguation)
 Sekai no Owari (disambiguation), Japanese for "end of the world"
 "Waiting for the End of the World", a song by Elvis Costello from My Aim Is True